The following article is a summary of the 2020 Indonesia national football team results.

Men's national football team

Frienday

Indonesia national under-19 football team

Goalscorers

Managers of 2019

Frienday 
The following is a list of friendlies (to be) played by the men's under-19 national team in 2020.

International Frinday

Men's under-16

Friendlies 
The following is a list of friendlies (to be) played by the men's under-16 national team in 2020.

Notes

References

Indonesia
2020